Douar or Ed-Douar is small, mainly Maronite, village located in the Metn District of the Mount Lebanon Governorate of Lebanon. Douar means "round about".

Location
The municipality of Douar is located in the Kaza of Matn, in the mohafazat (governorate) of Mount Lebanon. Its elevation is between 1050 and 1150 meters above sea level.

See also 
 Christianity in Lebanon

References

Populated places in the Matn District
Maronite Christian communities in Lebanon